Jill Quigley (born May 11, 1953) is a former Republican member of the Kansas House of Representatives, who represented the 17th district. She served from 2008 to 2011. Quigley ran for re-election in 2010, but was defeated in the primary election by Kelly Meigs.

Prior to her election, Quigley has worked in various nursing positions for over 35 years. Currently she is an outreach coordinator with Southwest Boulevard Family Health Care. She received her BS in Nursing from the University of Missouri and her MS in Nursing from the University of Michigan.

Quigley is a member of the Junior League of Wyandotte and Johnson Counties and has served in numerous positions on the PTA of Rising Star Elementary School, Trailridge Middle School, and Shawnee Mission Northwest High School.

She has been married to her husband Jim since 1975; they have three children.

Committee membership
 Commerce and Labor
 Health and Human Services
 Transportation and Public Safety Budget

Major donors
The top 5 donors to Quigley's 2008 campaign:
1. Quigley, Jill $3,000 	
2. Kansans for Lifesaving Cures $1,000
3. Kansas Medical Society $1,000 	
4. Kansas National Education Assoc $1,000 	
5. Kansas Assoc of Realtors $900

References

External links
 Official website
 Kansas Legislature - Jill Quigley
 Project Vote Smart profile
 Kansas Votes profile
 State Surge - Legislative and voting track record
 Follow the Money campaign contributions:
 2008

Republican Party members of the Kansas House of Representatives
Living people
University of Michigan School of Nursing alumni
Women state legislators in Kansas
University of Missouri alumni
1953 births
21st-century American women politicians
21st-century American politicians